Leonardo Blanchard (born 6 May 1988) is an Italian footballer who plays as a centre-back.

Club career
Born in Grosseto, Tuscany, Blanchard started his career at his hometown club Sauro Rispescia, located in Rispescia frazione.

Siena
On 30 August 2005 he was signed by Serie A team Siena, which is also a Tuscan team. He played for its Berretti team (B team of under-20 age group or U-18 team). In the next season he left for Poggibonsi, but in January 2007 left for Serie D team Sangimignano; the team was relegated to Eccellenza Tuscany at the end of season. Blanchard was promoted to the Primavera under-20 team of Siena in 2007–08 season.

In 2008, he left for Valle del Giovenco, his first team outside Tuscany, where he spent  seasons. At the end of the 2010 winter (January) transfer window, he left for Pergocrema, with Fabrizio Di Bella moving in the opposite direction on a temporary deal. He played both legs of the relegation "play-out".

In July 2010 he left for Pavia.
He was a call-up to Siena's pre-season camp in 2011. He played a few friendlies before he left the club on 20 July.

Frosinone
On 9 August 2012 he left for Frosinone. On 19 June 2013 Frosinone bought Blanchard's registration rights definitively for a peppercorn fee of €1,000.

On 23 September 2015, Blanchard made Frosinone club history by scoring the equalizing goal in the closing minute of stoppage time in a 1–1 draw against Serie A giants, Juventus. This was Frosinone's first historical Serie A point. Blanchard also revealed it was "an emotional moment" especially since he declared to have been a Juventus fan for a long time.

Carpi
In mid-2016 he was signed by Carpi. He joined the pre-season camp circa 22 July. He was assigned No.23 shirt. On 30 January 2017 Blanchard left for Brescia on loan.

Blanchard returned to Carpi in mid-2017. However, he was left out from the squad for 2017–18 Serie B season.

On 31 January 2018 Blanchard left for Alessandria. Blanchard was released by Carpi in July 2018 in a mutual consent.

References

External links
 Football.it Profile  
 Pergocrema Profile (2009–10)  
 
 

1988 births
Living people
Italian footballers
Serie A players
Serie B players
Serie C players
A.C.N. Siena 1904 players
U.S. Poggibonsi players
U.S. Pergolettese 1932 players
F.C. Pavia players
Frosinone Calcio players
A.C. Carpi players
Brescia Calcio players
U.S. Alessandria Calcio 1912 players
Association football central defenders
People from Grosseto
Footballers from Tuscany
Sportspeople from the Province of Grosseto